Springfield Township is one of twenty townships in Allen County, Indiana, United States. As of the 2010 census, its population was 4,349. The principal town in Springfield Township is the village of Harlan.

Geography

Unincorporated towns
 Cuba
 Georgetown
 Harlan
(This list is based on USGS data and may include former settlements.)

Adjacent townships
The township is adjacent to these Indiana townships:
 Cedar Creek (west)
 Maumee (southeast)
 Milan (southwest)
 Scipio (east)
 Jackson Township, DeKalb County (northwest)
 Newville Township, DeKalb County (northeast)
 Spencer Township, DeKalb County (north)

Major highways

References

Citations

Sources
 United States Census Bureau cartographic boundary files
 U.S. Board on Geographic Names

Townships in Allen County, Indiana
Fort Wayne, IN Metropolitan Statistical Area
Townships in Indiana